Fohr or Föhr is a German surname that may refer to the following notable people: 
Alexander Föhr (born 1980), German politician 
Anja Seibert-Fohr (born 1969), German jurist
Daniel Fohr (1801–1862), German painter
Haley Fohr (born 1988), American vocalist, composer, and singer-songwriter who releases music under the names Circuit Des Yeux and Jackie Lynn
Karl Philipp Fohr (1795–1818), German painter, brother of Daniel 
Myron Fohr (1912–1994), American racecar driver
Robert Fohr (born 1954), French art historian, translator and author
Tero Föhr (born 1980), Finnish orienteering competitor

German-language surnames